Triple Trouble may refer to:

Triple Trouble (1918 film), starring Charlie Chaplin 
Triple Trouble (1950 film), a Bowery Boys film
3pol Trobol: Huli Ka Balbon!, a 2019 Philippine film
"Triple Trouble" (song), by the Beastie Boys
Sonic the Hedgehog: Triple Trouble, a video game starring Sonic the Hedgehog

See also 
 Double Trouble (disambiguation)